Carter Lake is a city in Pottawattamie County, Iowa, United States. A suburb of Omaha, Nebraska, it sits surrounding the south and west sides of the region's major airport, Eppley Airfield. It is separated from the rest of Iowa by the Missouri River, effectively making it an exclave. The population was 3,791 at the 2020 census.

History
Carter Lake is an example of the border irregularities of the United States, being the only city in Iowa located west of the Missouri River. In March 1877, a flood redirected the course of the river 1.25 mi (2 km) to the southeast. The remnants of the old river course, called Saratoga Bend, became an oxbow lake, named Carter Lake. Soon after the formation of the lake, the site became a flourishing recreational area. It included "a boathouse at the foot of Locust street, hotels and club houses were numerous and the lake was the scene of many a pleasant rowing and fishing party."

In 1892, after extensive litigation between Iowa and Nebraska, the Supreme Court of the United States ruled that Carter Lake belonged to Iowa in Nebraska v. Iowa, 143 U.S. 359 (1892). Although the general rule is that state boundaries follow gradual changes in the course of a river, the Court ruled that an exception exists when a river avulses one of its bends. In 1972, the Supreme Court made another ruling on the circumstances of Carter Lake when it ruled on a boundary dispute between the two states in Nebraska v. Iowa, 406 U.S. 117 (1972).

Although Carter Lake was legally considered part of Council Bluffs, residents paid city taxes but lacked the basic city services enjoyed by residents east of the Missouri River. The community successfully seceded from Council Bluffs in the 1920s, intending to become part of Omaha, Nebraska, but Omaha did not want to pay to extend sewers or water lines.

Two early, separate amusement parks were located in Carter Lake: from 1905 to 1917, there was the Courtland Beach Amusement Park, and from 1917 to 1933, the Lakeview Amusement Park. The Munchoff Brothers, who were the original operators of Omaha's Krug Park, ran both parks; in 1917, they moved rides from Courtland to Lakeview. In 1945, one of the brothers donated the rides from the old parks to the World War II metal drives.

On July 2, 1930, Carter Lake was incorporated as a city, in the state of Iowa.

In the 1930s and 40s, Carter Lake became a gambling hot spot, as law enforcement was limited and because of its important location. At The Chez Paree, you "could listen to Sophie Tucker, have the best prime rib in town and enjoy a gambling raid or two." Patrons could "bet on any horse race in the United States," and the business was described as "the most active casino between Chicago and the West Coast."

The mistaken belief that a defendant corporation located in Carter Lake was a legal resident of Nebraska resulted in another U.S. Supreme Court case, Owen Equipment & Erection Co. v. Kroger, 437 U.S. 365 (1978). The case clarified the law regarding ancillary jurisdiction, which allows claims based on state law to be heard in a federal court when related to a claim based on federal law.

Geography

Carter Lake is located at  (41.292647, -95.913989).

The city is surrounded on three sides by Omaha, Nebraska, and on the fourth by the Missouri River.

Carter Lake creates a geographic oddity for travelers going to Eppley Airfield, which it surrounds on the south and west. Consequently, travelers going to Eppley Airfield from anywhere except North Omaha will go through Carter Lake, Iowa. It has caused great confusion when travelers not used to the area go through and see a "Welcome to Iowa" sign on their way to and from the airport.

Demographics

2000 census
As of the census of 2000, there were 3,248 people, 1,221 households, and 914 families residing in the city. The racial makeup of the city was 96.71% White, 0.25% African American, 0.74% Native American, 0.25% Asian, 0.86% from other races, and 1.20% from two or more races. 2.89% of the population were Hispanic or Latino of any race.

There were 1,221 households, out of which 32.3% had children under the age of 18 living with them, 55.4% were married couples living together, 13.3% had a female householder with no husband present, and 25.1% were non-families. 20.1% of all households were made up of individuals, and 7.5% had someone living alone who was 65 years of age or older. The average household size was 2.66 and the average family size was 3.04.

Age/gender breakdown: 25.9% under the age of 18, 8.0% from 18 to 24, 29.8% from 25 to 44, 24.3% from 45 to 64, and 12.0% who were 65 years of age or older. The median age was 37 years. For every 100 females, there were 100.1 males. For every 100 females age 18 and over, there were 94.4 males.

The median income for a household in the city was $37,851, and the median income for a family was $42,794. Males had a median income of $30,946 versus $23,309 for females. The per capita income for the city was $18,758. 7.1% of the population and 4.9% of families were below the poverty line. Out of the total population, 11.6% of those under the age of 18 and 2.9% of those 65 and older were living below the poverty line.

2010 census
As of the census of 2010, there were 3,785 people, 1,388 households, and 997 families residing in the city. The racial makeup of the city was 90.3% White, 1.0% African American, 0.8% Native American, 0.5% Asian, 5.8% from other races, and 1.6% from two or more races. Hispanic or Latino of any race were 11.5% of the population.

There were 1,388 households, of which 37.4% had children under the age of 18 living with them, 46.5% were married couples living together, 17.9% had a female householder with no husband present, 7.4% had a male householder with no wife present, and 28.2% were non-families. 22.3% of all households were made up of individuals, and 8.2% had someone living alone who was 65 years of age or older. The average household size was 2.73 and the average family size was 3.16.

The median age in the city was 36.1 years. 28.3% of residents were under the age of 18; 8.3% were between the ages of 18 and 24; 25.1% were from 25 to 44; 25.5% were from 45 to 64; and 12.8% were 65 years of age or older. The gender makeup of the city was 49.4% male and 50.6% female.

Politics
The current mayor of Carter Lake is Ron Cumberledge, elected on November 7, 2017.

See also

Gambling in Omaha, Nebraska
Kentucky Bend

References

External links

City of Carter Lake
History of Carter Lake
Edward F. Owen Memorial Library 
Carter Lake Elementary School 
Carter Lake Community Resource Center
Carter Lake Preservation Society
Carter Lake Weather
Map showing history of Missouri River shifts at Carter Lake

Border irregularities of the United States
Cities in Iowa
Internal territorial disputes of the United States
Cities in Pottawattamie County, Iowa
Iowa populated places on the Missouri River
Exclaves in the United States